Remixes is a remix compilation album from British pop music act Shakespears Sister. The album was previously released on digital format exclusively in 2010 through Siobhan Fahey's website under her own name for a short time before being discontinued. It was released again in October 2012 on CD and digital format through numerous major retailers such as Amazon and iTunes.

Track listing

References 

2012 compilation albums
Shakespears Sister albums

pl:The Best of Shakespears Sister